The Lan is a river in Belarus, approximately  long. It is a left tributary of the Pripyat.

External links 
 

Rivers of Brest Region
Rivers of Minsk Region
Rivers of Belarus